Somdiha  is a village development committee in Kapilvastu District in the Lumbini Zone of southern Nepal. At the time of the 1991 Nepal census it had a population of 4069 people living in 665 individual households. Somdiha is near to Khunuwa border india . 

Populated places in Kapilvastu District